The following highways are numbered 629:

United States